Associazione Calcio Palmanova, or simply Palmanova, was an Italian association football club located in Palmanova, Friuli-Venezia Giulia. In 2010 it was dissolved and since then it has been carrying out only youth activities.

History
It participated in Serie C seasons in the 30s (1934–35 Prima Divisione) and in the 40s and reaching the top in 1946–47 Serie C where, with Renzo Burini (who later moved to A.C. Milan), it reached the 3rd place.

Gradually falling from category, the Amaranto team ("Amaranth", so called by the fans for their social colors) reached the lowest point in its history, risking relegation to Terza Categoria (the lowest in Italy) at the end of the 1973–74 season.

During the summer of that year, commander Dino Bruseschi, chairman of Udinese in the 1950s and 1960s, born in Palmanova and mayor of the town at the time, was convinced by his friends to take over the team's fate.

In the new sports center just inaugurated, AC Palmanova won the Seconda Categoria in 1974–75 and the Prima Categoria in 1975–76. In the 1976–77 season, after a heated fight against C.M.M. San Michele gave way in the direct match (with two counterattack goals from Botta and Di Blas) and had to settle for second place. In the following 1977–78 season, after the change of coach (Fulvio Zonch in place of Franco Sclauzero) a comeback began (27 points out of 30 in the second half of season) ending with a play-off against Pro Gorizia played at the Stadio Friuli of Udine in front of 6,000 spectators and finished 1-1 after extra time; the draw favored the Amaranto team that entered into the Serie D. The following year, in the division (at that time semi-professional category) AC Palmanova for three quarters of the season could think of a further jump to Serie C2 but collapsed in the last few days.

In the following years, AC Palmanova alternates seasons in Serie D (1978–79, 1979–80, 1991–92, 1992–93, 1995–96, 1996–97, 2000–01) with relegations to Eccellenza and to Promozione until the 2008–09 season, when it was relegated first to Promozione and the following year to Prima Categoria. In 2009–10, the centenary year, the club is now not only without funds and also in debt.

There are several managers who take turns at the "bedside" of the club but no one can do anything to save it. The inevitable failure occurs at the end of the season.

The club changes its name to A.S.D. Palma Calcio and takes care of the pure youth activity waiting to recreate a team to be registered in Terza Categoria.

Recent seasons

Key

Honours
Eccellenza Friuli-Venezia Giulia (1st regional level)
Winners: 1977–78, 1990–91, 1994–95

Promozione Friuli-Venezia Giulia (2nd regional level)
Winners: 1963–64, 1975–76, 1988–89, 1998–99

Prima Categoria Friuli-Venezia Giulia (3rd regional level)
Winners: 1974–75

Seconda Categoria Friuli-Venezia Giulia (4th regional level)
Winners: 2010–11

Coppa Italia Dilettanti Friuli-Venezia Giulia
Runners-up: 1999–00

Coppa Regione Friuli-Venezia Giulia (Region Cup)
Winners: 1989

Colors and badge 
AC Palmanova color was amaranth.

References

External links
AC Palmanova page @ facebook.com

Palmanova
Palmanova
Palmanova